Tindeklypa is a double summit separated by a deep ravine. Photographed from the air by the German Antarctic Expedition (1938–39). Mapped by Norwegian cartographers from surveys and air photos by the Norwegian-British-Swedish Antarctic Expedition (NBSAE) (1949–1952), led by John Schjelderup Giæver and air photos by the Norwegian expedition (1958–59) and named "Tindeklypa" (the summit ravine).

Mountains of Queen Maud Land
Princess Martha Coast